Andy Martin is an American jazz trombonist and Los Angeles studio player. He is a member of Gordon Goodwin's Big Phat Band and was the featured soloist with Bill Holman big band for 15 years and has been in Tom Kubis' big band since its inception.

Career 
In addition to being a top jazz soloist, Martin has  played in over 350 major motion pictures, including the trombone solo in the opening credits of Monsters, Inc.and played the trombone solos in the movie La La Land and The Secret Life of Pets. He is also the trombone soloist for the character of Connie in the Pixar film Soul. He has played on television shows such as Family Guy, King of the Hill, Dancing with the Stars, and American Dad!. Martin was the lead trombone on American Idol in seasons one through three. He was initiated as an honorary member of Phi Mu Alpha Sinfonia in 2018 at the National Convention in New Orleans, Louisiana.

Discography
 Leading Off (Resurgent, 1995)
 Andy Martin & Metropole Orchestra (Mons, 1997)
 The Project with Vic Lewis (Drewbone, 2004)
 Trombone Titans with Carl Fontana (Drewbone, 2013)

References

External links 
 Official site

Year of birth missing (living people)
Living people
21st-century trombonists
American jazz trombonists
Male trombonists
American male jazz musicians
Gordon Goodwin's Big Phat Band members
21st-century American male musicians
Lyle Lovett and His Large Band members